A list of films produced in Egypt in 1956. For an A-Z list of films currently on Wikipedia, see :Category:Egyptian films.

External links
 Egyptian films of 1956 at the Internet Movie Database
 Egyptian films of 1956 elCinema.com

Lists of Egyptian films by year
1956 in Egypt
Lists of 1956 films by country or language